Nagieb Khaja (born 1979 in Copenhagen) is a Danish journalist, documentary filmmaker and writer. A war correspondent, Khaja has reported for the likes of Al Jazeera English, Vice and BBC from Afghanistan, Syria and Palestine. Khaja has been nominated twice for the Cavling Prize, a prestigious Danish journalist award.

Personal life 
Khaja is of Afghan descent. He attended the University of Southern Denmark, graduating with a degree in journalism.

Filmography 

 2012: My Afghanistan - Life in the Forbidden Zone (Mit Afghanistan - Livet i den forbudte Zone)

References 

1979 births
Living people
21st-century Danish journalists
Danish documentary filmmakers
21st-century Danish male writers
University of Southern Denmark alumni